Bahrain (Torwali/Pashto: بحرین; also spelled Behrain) is a town located in Swat District of Khyber Pakhtunkhwa, Pakistan, 60 km North of Mingora at an elevation of 4700 ft on the right bank of the Swat river. It is named Bahrain (lit. "two rivers") due to its location at the confluence of the Daral and Swat rivers. It is known for its riverside tourist resorts, local handicrafts, and its view of the merging of the Daral and Swat Rivers. It also serves as a base camp for the trail that leads to the Daral & Saidgai lakes.

Climate
With a mild and generally warm and temperate climate, Bahrain has a humid subtropical climate (Cfa) under the Köppen climate classification.

See also
 Marghazar
 Miandam
 Malam Jabba
 Madyan
 Kalam
 Gabina Jabba
 Bashigram Lake
 Swat District

References

External links
Khyber-Pakhtunkhwa Government website section on Lower Dir and neighboring places
United Nations
 http://www.swatvalley.com
 http://www.khpalswat.com
 http://www.valleyswat.net
 https://ibtswat.academia.edu/

Tehsils of Swat District
Populated places in Swat District
Swat Kohistan
Tourist attractions in Swat